Sai Shiva Balaji  Mandir is a Hindu temple dedicated to Sai Baba of Shirdi. The temple is located on the banks of the Godavari river.
The temple was built for the Shri Sai Shiva Balaji Mandir Trust by the  trustees Shri V. Narsimha Shastry and his youngest son V.N. Pravin Shastry to spread the message of Sai Baba of Shirdi. The foundation stone was laid in  1994.

Visitors must remove their shoes before entering, to preserve the sanctity of the temple complex.

Accommodations
The Sai Bhaktha Nivas is a place made for the visitors where in rooms are available to stay, and also a kalyana mandapam (wedding hall) for some auspicious functions such as marriages, upanayana (sacred thread initiation ceremony), akshara bhyasam etcetera.

External links
 https://web.archive.org/web/20110710031603/http://www.saibabatempledmp.in/

Hindu temples in Karimnagar district
Sai Baba of Shirdi